Eupithecia concava is a moth in the family Geometridae. It is found in Taiwan.

The wingspan is about 19–22 mm. The forewings are saturated reddish brown and the hindwings are whitish brown with slightly darker terminal and anal areas.

References

Moths described in 2007
concava
Moths of Taiwan